Great Lakes Treaty may refer to:

Rush–Bagot Treaty, a naval disarmament treaty between the British Empire and the United States, signed 1817.
Webster–Ashburton Treaty, a boundary treaty between the British Empire and the United States, signed 1842.
Boundary Waters Treaty of 1909, a boundary and environmental agreement between Canada and the United States.
Great Lakes Water Quality Agreement, an environmental treaty between the United States and Canada, signed 1972.
Great Lakes Charter, an environmental agreement between eight US states and two Canadian provinces, signed 1985
Great Lakes–Saint Lawrence River Basin Sustainable Water Resources Agreement, an environmental agreement between eight US states and two Canadian provinces, signed 2005.
Great Lakes Compact, an interstate compact among the U.S. states of Illinois, Indiana, Michigan, Minnesota, New York, Ohio, Pennsylvania and Wisconsin, first signed 2007.